Aarohanam or Arohanam may refer to:

 Aarohanam (1980 film), a Malayalam film
 Aarohanam (2012 film), a Tamil film
 Arohanam (novel), a 1969 Malayalam-language novel by V. K. N.
 Arohana, ascending scale of notes in Indian classical music